The Men's 800 metres at the 2011 All-Africa Games took place on 11 and 13 September at the Estádio Nacional do Zimpeto.

Medalists

Records
Prior to the competition, the following records were as follows.

Schedule

Results

Heats
Qualification: First 2 in each heat (Q) and the next 2 fastest (q) advance to the Final.

Final

References

External links

800 meters